The Minister of Foreign Affairs and International Cooperation of the Republic of Somaliland is the government minister who heads the Ministry of Foreign Affairs and International Cooperation of the Republic of Somaliland and is a member of the Cabinet of Somaliland. The minister is responsible for overseeing the international relations of the government.

Process of appointment

List of Foreign Ministers

See also

Foreign relations of Somaliland
Diplomatic missions of Somaliland
List of diplomatic missions in Somaliland

References

Politics of Somaliland

External links
 Constitution in English

Government of Somaliland